IHS Towers is one of the largest telecommunications infrastructure providers in Africa, Latin America and the Middle East by tower count and the fourth largest independent multinational tower company globally.

Operations

Founded by Sam Darwish in Lagos, Nigeria, in 2001, IHS is a company specializing in building and operating telecommunication infrastructure throughout emerging markets. Following the completion of a sale and lease back agreement with the mobile network operator Zain in Kuwait, and the acquisition of Cell Site Solutions in February 2020, IHS Towers expanded its operations to outside of Africa and now operate across three continents. It is one of the world’s fastest growing tower operators, owning and managing over 39,000 towers in nine countries: Cameroon, Cote d’Ivoire, Nigeria, Rwanda, Zambia - Africa; Brazil, Colombia, Peru – Latin America; and Kuwait – Middle East.

IHS listed on the NYSE in October 2021 in what was noted as the largest US listing of a company with an African heritage.

The company operates six business models: building its own tower sites and leasing them to operators; acquiring existing MNO sites and leasing tower space back; taking over the management of operators networks with an agreement to lease the sites to other operators: inbuilding solutions and Distributed Antenna System (DAS); Small Cell and Fiber to the Tower.

In November 2021, IHS expanded its fiber offering and closed its acquisition of a 51% stake in FiberCo Solucoes de Infraestrutura from TIM Brasil. The company to acquire MTN South Africa’s towers, and a partnership with EDCI, a subsidiary owned by the Egyptian Government, to build 5,800 towers over the next three years.

IHS increased its use of solar energy and hybrid power systems to reduce its overall emissions, as at December 2020, over 45% of its African operations had solar power available.

Some of the MNOs that IHS works with include: MTN, Orange, Airtel, Etisalat, Millicom, Zain and Vivo.

IHS is heavily involved in bringing broadband internet to the whole of Africa. IHS partners with startup telecom companies such as Spectranet and Smile to help finance the deployment of their network into urban areas.

Aside from its founding partners, UBC, IHS is supported by a group of international shareholders including Emerging Capital Partners, the International Finance Corporation, Wendel, Goldman Sachs, African Infrastructure Investment Managers, Investec, the IFC’s Global Infrastructure Fund, the Dutch development finance institution (FMO) and the Korea Investment Corporation and Singapore sovereign wealth fund, GIC.

The IHS Board includes Jeb Bush, the former Florida governor and GOP presidential hopefully, who heads the governance committee; Ursula Burns, the former Xerox CEO and the first Black woman to lead a Fortune 500 company, who also sits on the Uber and Nestle boards; and Carolina Lacerda, the former head of investments banking of UBS in Brazil.

Competitors
IHS competitors in Africa include Helios Towers and American Tower Corporation.

References

Telecommunications companies of Nigeria
Telecommunication services
Multinational companies based in Lagos
2001 establishments in Nigeria
2021 initial public offerings